Mimico High School (MHS) is a former public secondary school in Toronto, Ontario, Canada. It served the Mimico neighborhood in Etobicoke. The school was opened in 1924 by the Mimico Board of Education and joined the Etobicoke Board of Education in 1967. It was the first high school and the oldest to operate in the former City of Etobicoke, after Etobicoke Collegiate Institute. 

Since closing in 1988, Mimico became the adult learning Centre as "Mimico Adult Learning Centre". In 1993, "John English Junior Middle School", which was founded in 1884, took over the Mimico building. The school is operated by the Toronto District School Board and it is named after a prominent Mimico High School principal.

History
Mimico's first schools were basic wooden structures. John English JMS was the first brick building in Mimico, built in 1884 at the corner of Royal York and Mimico Avenue as a one-room brick building. The original structure was replaced by a new building in 1957. Mimico High School building opened in 1924 with five additions added to the original Collegiate Gothic structure in 1926, 1957, 1962, 1963, and 1966. 

Since the 1920s, the school has been on the north corner of Royal York Road and Mimico Avenue. It was a large two-story brick edifice that reached to Elizabeth Street. In the early 1950s, there were separate playgrounds for boys and girls, with a wood fence between them. The ceilings were ornamented plaster set in a square pattern by the old caretaker (who lived in a small house on the Elizabeth Street end) after hours, who was a never-ending source of school and local area history.

With declining enrollment at Mimico High School, the building was offered to the Metropolitan Separate School Board (now the Toronto Catholic District School Board) as the number of Catholics had been increasing with many Italian and Polish immigrants arriving in Mimico. This offer was refused and an Adult Learning Centre was opened there until that institution swapped schools with John English Junior Middle School in 1993.

The school is named after a well known former Mimico High School principal.

Notable alumni
 David Ernest Hornell, recipient of the Victoria Cross during World War II
 Les Stroud, filmmaker
 Jerome Drayton, marathon runner who won the Boston Marathon, and who placed 6th in the 1976 Summer Olympics

See also

List of high schools in Ontario

References

External links

Mimico
Mimico High School
Facebook group
Class of 1966

John English
John English Junior Middle School 
TDSB profile
School Advisory Council 

Schools in the TDSB
High schools in Toronto
Education in Etobicoke
Educational institutions established in 1924
Educational institutions disestablished in 1988
Defunct schools in Canada
1924 establishments in Ontario